The Noida Sector 78 is a metro station of the Noida Metro railway, in the city of Noida in India. It adjoins sector 76, 77 and sector 78 of Noida, covering around 100,000 population of Noida.

The metro station is on the Aqua line of NMRC. International Women's day on 7 March 2020 saw the station turning into pink with all women staff and many other initiates.

References

External links 

Noida Metro stations
Railway stations in Gautam Buddh Nagar district
Transport in Noida